The Badoura State Forest is a state forest located in Cass County and Hubbard County, Minnesota. 85% of the forest is managed by the Minnesota Department of Natural Resources, with the remaining 15% managed privately and by counties. Over half of the forest land is wetlands interspersed with Jack pine.

Outdoor recreation activities include hunting, hiking and backcountry camping.

See also
List of Minnesota state forests

External links
Badoura State Forest - Minnesota Department of Natural Resources (DNR)

References

Minnesota state forests
Protected areas of Cass County, Minnesota
Protected areas of Hubbard County, Minnesota
Protected areas established in 1963
1963 establishments in Minnesota